Fernand Cormon (24 December 1845 – 20 March 1924) was a French painter born in Paris. He became a pupil of Alexandre Cabanel, Eugène Fromentin, and Jean-François Portaels, and one of the leading historical painters of modern France.

Biography
His father was the playwright Eugène Cormon. His mother was Charlotte Furais, the actress.

At an early age he attracted attention for the perceived sensationalism in his art, although for a time his powerful brush dwelled with particular delight on scenes of bloodshed, such as the Murder in the Seraglio (1868) and the Death of Ravana, King of Lanka at the Toulouse Museum. The Musée d'Orsay has his Cain fleeing before Jehovah's Curse; and for the Mairie of the fourth arrondissement of Paris he executed in grisaille a series of panels: Birth, Death, Marriage, War, etc. A Chiefs Funeral, and a series of large paintings for the Museum of natural history in Paris with themes from the Stone Age, occupied him for several years. He was appointed to the Legion of Honor in 1880. Subsequently he also devoted himself to portraiture.

Being well-accepted at the annual Salon, he also ran an art school, the Atelier Cormon in the 1880s where he tried to guide his students to create paintings which would be accepted by the Salon's jury. Among his students with whom he was unsuccessful on this point were, for instance: Henri de Toulouse-Lautrec, Louis Anquetin, Eugène Boch, Paul Tampier, Émile Bernard and Vincent van Gogh. Other students included Alphonse Osbert, Marius Borgeaud, Theodor Pallady, Chaïm Soutine and the  Australian painter John Russell.

Despite his moment of glory as a Beaux-Arts professor he was almost forgotten by 1924 when he was run over by a taxi outside his studio, and is barely remembered today save as the teacher of pupils more illustrious than himself.

Selected paintings

References

External links

Atelier Cormon ~1885 (note e.g. [from left; mind inscriptions] Toulouse-Lautrec, Tampier, Anquetin; last row, second after sculpture, É. Bernard).

1845 births
1924 deaths
19th-century French painters
20th-century French painters
20th-century French male artists
Academic art
Painters from Paris
French male painters
Recipients of the Legion of Honour
Orientalist painters
Members of the Académie des beaux-arts
People of Montmartre
19th-century French male artists